LMDS may refer to:

LMDS (band), or Les messagers du son, a Montreal hip hop musical duo
Los Mismos De Siempre - Abbreviated as LMDS, is fans of La Renga
Local Multipoint Distribution Service, abbreviated as LMDS, being microwave signals to transmit voice, video, and data signals for short distances
Multichannel Multipoint Distribution Service, LMDS related to MMDS abbreviation for Multichannel Multipoint Distribution Service
Life Model Decoy, in plural LMDs, fictional androids appearing in comic books